Banaskantha Lok Sabha constituency ( / बनासकांठा) is one of the 26 Lok Sabha (parliamentary) constituencies in Gujarat state in western India.

Vidhan Sabha segments
Presently, Banaskantha Lok Sabha constituency comprises seven Vidhan Sabha (legislative assembly) segments. These are:

Members of Lok Sabha

^ by-poll

Election results

General election 2019

General election 2014

Bye election 2013

General election 2009

General election 2004

General election 1952
 Chavda Akbar Dalumiyan (INC) : 91,753 votes 
 Mehta Gordhandas Girdharlal (SP) : 36,042

See also
 Banaskantha district
 List of Constituencies of the Lok Sabha

Notes

Lok Sabha constituencies in Gujarat
Politics of Banaskantha district